Kot is a small village south of Kapca in the Municipality of Lendava in the Prekmurje region of Slovenia. It lies on the left bank of the Mura River, on the border with Croatia.

The small church in the settlement is dedicated to Saint Anthony of Padua and belongs to the Parish of Lendava.

References

External links
Kot on Geopedia

Populated places in the Municipality of Lendava